"Slave to the Music" is a song by British singer-songwriter James Morrison, released as the third single from his third studio album, The Awakening. The single was due for release on 20 February 2012 in the United Kingdom, however, the song received an advanced release on 5 August 2011 in the Netherlands. The music video was uploaded to Morrison's official YouTube account on 19 August 2011 and included on the bonus DVD contained within the Tesco deluxe edition of The Awakening.

Background
In an interview for Digital Spy, James described the track:  "Slave to the Music' is one where when I finished writing it, I thought it was pretty cool. It's the first song that I've written where I can imagine it getting played in a club. Normally I would never imagine any of my songs getting played in a club! So that was a first for me."

Critical reception
Allmusic's Jon O'Brien perceived that "only on the funky R&B beats and Michael Jackson-esque chorus of "Slave to the Music," where Morrison begins to show some of the invention that was allegedly so heavily restricted on his previous effort." Pip Elwood wrote for "Entertainment Focus" that the song is a "standout track, where Morrison explores deeper rhythms."

Chart performance
The song debuted at the Dutch Top 40 chart, at number fifty-four. In the second week, it climbed to number twenty-one. In the third week, it climbed again to number nineteen. In the fourth week, it reached number fifteen, where it stayed for another week. In the sixth week, it peaked at number nine. Later, it fell to number seventeen and in the last week, it fell to number twenty-two.

Track listing

Charts

Weekly charts

Year-end charts

Release history

References

2011 singles
2012 singles
James Morrison (singer) songs
2011 songs
Songs written by Toby Gad
Songs written by James Morrison (singer)
Island Records singles